Lago delle Lame is a lake in the Province of Genova, Liguria, Italy.

Lakes of Liguria